Charanjit Kaur Bajwa is an Indian politician and a member of Indian National Congress. She was Member of Punjab Legislative Assembly and represented Qadian. She is the wife of the former Punjab Pradesh Congress committee president and Ex Member of the Lok Sabha from Gurdaspur Pratap Singh Bajwa (now a Rajyasabha MP).

Political career
Bajwa was elected to the Punjab Legislative Assembly in 2012 from Qadian. She was one of the 42 INC MLAs who submitted their resignation in protest of a decision of the Supreme Court of India ruling Punjab's termination of the Sutlej-Yamuna Link (SYL) water canal unconstitutional.

References

Punjab, India MLAs 2012–2017
Living people
1959 births
People from Gurdaspur district
21st-century Indian women politicians
21st-century Indian politicians
Women members of the Punjab Legislative Assembly